Saul Raiz (19 January 1930 – 3 December 2021) was a Brazilian politician Paraná. He served as the Mayor of Curitiba from 1975 to 1979.

Biography
A member of the National Renewal Alliance, he served as Mayor of Curitiba from 1975 to 1979.

References

1930 births
2021 deaths
Mayors of Curitiba
Democrats (Brazil) politicians